Kay-Uwe Ziegler (born 27 October 1963) is a German politician for the AfD and since 2021 a member of the Bundestag, the federal diet.

Life and politics

Ziegler was born 1963 in the East German city of Eisenach.
Ziegler was directly elected to the Bundestag in 2021.

References

1963 births
People from Eisenach
Members of the Bundestag for Saxony-Anhalt
Living people
Members of the Bundestag 2021–2025
Members of the Bundestag for the Alternative for Germany